Ismail Moutaraji (born 1 February 2000) is a Moroccan professional footballer who plays as a forward for Botola side Wydad AC.

Club career

Wydad AC 
On 15 July 2022, Moutaraji returned  to his first club Wydad AC.

On September 10, 2022, he was established under his new coach Hussein Ammouta on the occasion of the final of the CAF Super Cup against RS Berkane.

International career

On July 28, 2022, he was summoned by coach Hicham Dmii for a training camp with the Morocco A' team , appearing on a list of 23 players who will take part in the Islamic Solidarity Games in August 2022.

Honours

Club
Mohammédia
 Botola 2: 2019–20

Personal honours
 Botola Top Assist: 2022

References

External links
 

Living people
2000 births
Moroccan footballers
Morocco under-20 international footballers
Association football midfielders
Wydad AC players
SCC Mohammédia players
Botola players
Competitors at the 2019 African Games
African Games competitors for Morocco